Lukas Ibertsberger (born 6 August 2003) is an Austrian professional footballer who plays as a defender for 2. Liga club Liefering. He is the son of former Austrian international Robert Ibertsberger.

Career statistics

Club

Notes

References

2003 births
Living people
Austrian footballers
Austria youth international footballers
Association football defenders
2. Liga (Austria) players
FC Red Bull Salzburg players
FC Liefering players